Dzhida is the name of several rural localities in Russia:
Dzhida, Republic of Buryatia, a selo in Dzhidinsky District of the Republic of Buryatia
Dzhida, Zabaykalsky Krai, a selo in Baleysky District of Zabaykalsky Krai